Wallendorf may refer to:
Wallendorf (Eifel), a municipality in Rhineland-Palatinate, Germany
Wallendorf (Lichte), a part of the municipality Lichte, Thuringia, Germany
Wallendorf (Luppe), a part of the municipality Schkopau, Saxony-Anhalt, Germany
Wallendorf (Mogersdorf), a quarter of the town Mogersdorf in Burgenland, Austria 
Wallendorf (Weimar), abandoned village near Weimar, Thüringen, Germany
Spišské Vlachy,, a town in eastern Slovakia 
Unirea, Bistrița-Năsăud, (German: Wallendorf), a part of the town Bistrița, in Transylvania, Romania

See also:
 Wallendorfer Porzellan, a porcelain manufacturing company in Wallendorf (Lichte) in Thuringia